Rwindi is a town in Rutshuru Territory, North Kivu Province, Democratic Republic of the Congo.

Rwindi is located within Virunga National Park along the N2 road, and there is also another road formerly used by Somikivu to access to the Lueshe mine 40 km to the south.

References

Populated places in North Kivu